Norberto Carlos Araujo López (born October 13, 1978 in Rosario) is a retired Ecuadorian football central defender.

Club career
Araujo (nicknamed Beto) started his career in Finland in 1996 playing with premier division side TPS and 1st division side Kultsu. He then returned to Argentina where he played for Aldosivi, Arsenal de Sarandí and Racing de Córdoba in the 2nd division. In 2002, he moved to Peru where he played for Sport Boys and then Sporting Cristal where he won a Peruvian league title.

In 2007, Araujo joined L.D.U. Quito where he helped the club to win the Serie A in his first season. In 2008, he was part of the team that won the 2008 Copa Libertadores, eliminating 3 Argentine teams, including his former club Arsenal de Sarandí and winning the cup. In 2009, he would achieve the South American treble by winning the 2009 Copa Sudamericana and 2009 Recopa Sudamericana. Later in 2010 he was part of the team that won the 2010 Ecuadorian Copa Credife and Recopa sudamericana 2010.

International career
In late 2010, Araujo legally obtained his Ecuadorian citizenship, allowing him to be called up to the Ecuador national team. Despite not being called up for a number of pre-tournament friendlies, Araujo was chosen to be part of Ecuador's squad for the 2011 Copa América. He earned his first cap on June 25, 2011 versus Mexico in a friendly game prior to the start of the tournament. He went on to start in all three of Ecuador's group games in the Copa America.

Honors
Sporting Cristal
Primera División: 2005
L.D.U. Quito
Serie A (2): 2007, 2010
Copa Libertadores (1): 2008
Copa Sudamericana (1): 2009
Recopa Sudamericana (2): 2009, 2010

References

External links
 Araujo's FEF Player Card
 BDFA profile

1978 births
Living people
Footballers from Rosario, Santa Fe
Argentine emigrants to Ecuador
Naturalized citizens of Ecuador
Association football central defenders
Argentine footballers
Ecuadorian footballers
Ecuador international footballers
2011 Copa América players
Turun Palloseura footballers
Kultsu FC players
Aldosivi footballers
Arsenal de Sarandí footballers
Racing de Córdoba footballers
Sport Boys footballers
Sporting Cristal footballers
L.D.U. Quito footballers
Primera Nacional players
Ecuadorian Serie A players
Peruvian Primera División players
Veikkausliiga players
Ecuadorian expatriate footballers
Argentine expatriate sportspeople in Ecuador
Expatriate footballers in Peru
Expatriate footballers in Ecuador
Expatriate footballers in Finland
Argentine expatriate sportspeople in Peru